Harpiphorus is a genus of insects belonging to the family Tenthredinidae.

The species of this genus are found in Europe.

Species:
 Harpiphorus intermedius Dyar 
 Harpiphorus lepidus (Klug, 1818)

References

Tenthredinidae
Hymenoptera genera